Homeobox protein Hox-A11 is a protein that in humans is encoded by the HOXA11 gene.

Function 

In vertebrates, the genes encoding the class of transcription factors called homeobox genes are found in clusters named A, B, C, and D on four separate chromosomes. Expression of these proteins is spatially and temporally regulated during embryonic development. This gene is part of the A cluster on chromosome 7 and encodes a DNA-binding transcription factor which may regulate gene expression, morphogenesis, and differentiation. This gene is involved in the regulation of uterine development and is required for female fertility. Mutations in this gene can cause radioulnar synostosis with amegakaryocytic thrombocytopenia.

See also 
 Homeobox

References

Further reading

External links 
 

Transcription factors